The 2017–18 Villanova Wildcats men's basketball team represented Villanova University in the 2017–18 NCAA Division I men's basketball season. Led by head coach Jay Wright in his 17th year, the Wildcats played their home games at the Wells Fargo Center in Philadelphia, Pennsylvania as members of the Big East Conference. The Wildcats finished the season 36–4, 14–4 in Big East play to finish in second place. They defeated Marquette, Butler, and Providence to win the Big East tournament championship. As a result, they received the conference's automatic bid to the NCAA tournament as the No. 1 seed in the East region, their third No.1 seed in four years. They defeated Radford, Alabama, West Virginia, and Texas Tech to advance to the Final Four for the second time in three years. In the National Semifinal, they defeated Kansas before defeating Michigan in the National Championship game to win their second national championship in three years. They won every game of the tournament by a double-digit margin and the team's tournament run is widely considered the most dominant ever along with being called among the best seasons of all time.

The Wildcats' home court, The Pavilion, underwent a temporary closure for a $60 million renovation project during the season. It reopened for the 2018–19 season with the new name of Finneran Pavilion after a Villanova alum who donated $22.6 million to Villanova. Accordingly, all home games for the 2017–18 season but one were played at the Wells Fargo Center. The exception was the November 29, 2017 game with Big 5 rival Penn; it was instead held at Jake Nevin Field House, which had been home to the team before the Pavilion's initial 1986 opening.

Previous season
The Wildcats finished the 2016–17 season 32–4, 15–3 in Big East play to win the regular season championship. In the Big East tournament, they defeated St. John's, Seton Hall, and Creighton to win the tournament championship. As a result, they received the conference's automatic bid to the NCAA tournament. The Wildcats were given the Tournament's overall No. 1 seed as a No. 1 seed in the East region. In the First Round they defeated Mount St. Mary's before being upset by No. 8-seeded Wisconsin in the Second Round. The loss marked the second time in the previous three tournaments that Villanova was upset by an eighth-seeded team.

Offseason

Departures

2017 recruiting class

Future recruits

2018 recruiting class

Preseason 
In its annual preseason preview, Blue Ribbon Yearbook ranked the Wildcats No. 12 in the country. Jalen Brunson was named a third team preseason All-American.

Villanova was picked to win the Big East in the conference's preseason Coaches' Poll for the fourth consecutive year. Jalen Brunson was named the unanimous preseason All-Big East player of the year.

Roster

Schedule and results

|-
!colspan=9 style=|Exhibition

|-
!colspan=12 style=|Regular season

|-
!colspan=9 style=|Big East tournament

|-
!colspan=9 style=|NCAA tournament

Rankings

^Coaches Poll did not release a Week 2 poll at the same time AP did.
*AP does not release post-NCAA tournament rankings

Gallery

References

Villanova
Villanova Wildcats men's basketball seasons
Villanova
Villanova
Villanova
NCAA Division I men's basketball tournament Final Four seasons
NCAA Division I men's basketball tournament championship seasons